Newbridge may refer to:

Places

Australia
Newbridge, New South Wales
Newbridge, Victoria
Newbridge Heights Public School

England
Newbridge, Bath, electoral ward
Newbridge, Cornwall, three places in Cornwall with the same name
Newbridge, East Sussex
Newbridge, Isle of Wight
Newbridge, Lancashire
Newbridge, North Yorkshire
Newbridge, Shropshire
Newbridge, Oxfordshire
Newbridge, Wolverhampton, a suburb of Wolverhampton, West Midlands
The Newbridge School

Ireland
Avoca, County Wicklow, a small town, once known as Newbridge
Newbridge, County Galway, a village 
Newbridge, County Kildare, a large town, sometimes known by its Irish name Droichead Nua

Northern Ireland
Newbridge, County Londonderry

Scotland
Newbridge, Dumfries and Galloway
Newbridge, Edinburgh, a village to the west of Edinburgh

Wales
Newbridge, Caerphilly (traditionally in Monmouthshire)
Newbridge, Ceredigion
Newbridge, Wrexham
Newbridge-on-Wye, Powys
Newbridge-on-Usk, Monmouthshire

Bridges
Newbridge, River Dart, bridge over the River Dart, Dartmoor in Devon 
Newbridge, River Thames, a bridge crossing of the River Thames, England

Companies
NewBridge Bank, headquartered in Greensboro, North Carolina, United States
Newbridge Capital, Asian private equity investment firm
Newbridge Networks
Newbridge Silverware

See also
New Bridge (disambiguation)